Carolina Arias Vidal (born 2 September 1990) is a Colombian footballer who plays as a right back for Atlético Junior and the Colombia women's national team.

Club career
In October 2016, Arias moved to Turkey, and joined 1207 Antalya Dçşemealtı Belediye Spor along with her compatriots Lady Andrade and Oriánica Velásquez to play in the 2016–17 Turkish Women's First Football League.

In January 2023, Arias joined Atlético Junior.

Career statistics
.

References

External links 
 

1990 births
Living people
Colombian women's footballers
Women's association football fullbacks
College women's soccer players in the United States
Orsomarso S.C. footballers
1207 Antalya Spor players
Atlético Nacional (women) players
Atlético Huila (women) players
Atlético Madrid Femenino players
Deportivo Cali (women) players
Colombia women's international footballers
2015 FIFA Women's World Cup players
Footballers at the 2015 Pan American Games
Pan American Games competitors for Colombia
Footballers at the 2016 Summer Olympics
Olympic footballers of Colombia
Footballers at the 2019 Pan American Games
Medalists at the 2019 Pan American Games
Pan American Games medalists in football
Pan American Games gold medalists for Colombia
Colombian expatriate women's footballers
Colombian expatriate sportspeople in the United States
Expatriate women's soccer players in the United States
Colombian expatriate sportspeople in Turkey
Expatriate women's footballers in Turkey
Colombian expatriate sportspeople in Spain
Expatriate women's footballers in Spain